Mehdiabad (also Romanized as Mehdīābād and Mahdīābād) is a village in Avarzaman Rural District, Samen District, Malayer County, Hamadan Province, Iran. At the 2006 census, its population was 182, in 54 families.

References 

Populated places in Malayer County